Ernő Kovács (born 2 February 1959) is a Hungarian mechanical technician and politician, member of the National Assembly (MP) from Fidesz Bács-Kiskun County Regional List between 2010 and 2014. Kovács was a member of the Committee on Employment and Labour since 14 May 2010.

He served as Mayor of Tiszakécske from 1998 to 2014. Kovács was appointed Director of the Bács-Kiskun County Government Office in July 2014, replacing János Kerényi.

References

1959 births
Living people
Fidesz politicians
Members of the National Assembly of Hungary (2010–2014)
Mayors of places in Hungary
People from Kecskemét